Wedlock is a 1991 American science fiction-action television film from HBO Pictures, directed by Lewis Teague and starring Rutger Hauer, Mimi Rogers, Joan Chen, and James Remar. It received an Emmy Nomination for Sound Editing.

The film follows a diamond thief sent to a prison which uses new technology linked explosive neck collars to keep its prisoners from escaping.  After learning who his collar is linked to, they escape but the police pursuing them and those who want the diamonds are a constant threat.

Synopsis 
After stealing diamonds in a robbery, diamond thief Frank Warren is betrayed by his best friend Sam and his fiancée Noelle, who turns him in to the authorities. Frank is sentenced to 12 years imprisonment at Camp Holliday, an experimental prison where each convict is fitted with an electronic collar containing an explosive device which is electronically connected to another inmate. If any inmate tries to escape from Camp Holliday, or is even just separated from their collar-mate by more than 100 yards, both their collars will explode. Frank learns the inmate he is connected to is Tracy Riggs, and Tracy and Frank both escape with their collars intact. On the run from the authorities, Frank and Tracy find they are being pursued by Sam and Noelle, believing Frank will lead them to the hidden diamonds. It is up to Frank and Tracy get to the diamonds without separating from each other by more than 100 yards.

Cast
 Rutger Hauer as Frank Warren
 Mimi Rogers as Tracy Riggs
 Joan Chen as Noelle
 James Remar as Sam
 Stephen Tobolowsky as Warden Holliday
 Basil Wallace as "Emerald"
 Grand L. Bush as Jasper
 Denis Forest as Puce
 Glenn Plummer as Teal
 Danny Trejo as Tough Prisoner #1

DVD release 
Xenon Entertainment released the film onto DVD in 2004. The film is only available in fullscreen (as it was made-for-television and aired on HBO), although widescreen versions have been made available on DVD in the United Kingdom and Australia.

External links 
 
 

1991 television films
1991 films
1990s prison films
American science fiction action films
American chase films
American science fiction television films
1990s science fiction action films
American prison films
ITC Entertainment films
Films directed by Lewis Teague
Films scored by Richard Gibbs
1990s English-language films
1990s American films